Franz Burchard Dörbeck ( in Fellin   in Fellin) was a Baltic German graphic artist and caricaturist born in Fellin (now Viljandi, Viljandi County, Estonia) in what was then the Governorate of Livonia

From 1814 to 1816 Dörbeck studied engraving with Fritz Neyer in St. Petersburg. After the early death of his first wife, Dörbeck moved to Riga where he was active from 1820 as a portrait artist. In 1823 Dörbeck moved to Berlin Germany where he continued as a graphic artist and book illustrator. He gained fame with his caricatures published in newspapers. Dörbeck died in 1835 in Viljandi.

In the 1960s one of the streets in Berlin's Spandau district was named after him: Dörbeckweg.

In Estonian cultural history Dörbeck is known as the author of the only surviving portrait of Kristjan Jaak Peterson, the founder of modern Estonian poetry.

See also
 List of Baltic German artists
 List of German painters

References

External links
 

1799 births
1835 deaths
People from Viljandi
People from Kreis Fellin
Baltic-German people
German caricaturists
19th-century Estonian people